Daniel Omar Domínguez (born 9 April 1966) is an Argentine boxer. He competed in the men's welterweight event at the 1984 Summer Olympics.

References

External links
 

1966 births
Living people
Argentine male boxers
Olympic boxers of Argentina
Boxers at the 1984 Summer Olympics
Sportspeople from Mendoza, Argentina
Welterweight boxers